Agyneta barrowsi is a species of sheet weaver found in the United States and Canada. It was described by Chamberlin & Ivie in 1944.

References

barrowsi
Spiders of North America
Spiders described in 1944
Taxa named by Wilton Ivie